Alan David Lamb (born 3 July 1952) is a Scottish former footballer who played as a midfielder. He won one cap for Scotland under-23s in 1974.

He began his career at Preston North End in 1972, and played under Sir Bobby Charlton. He moved to Port Vale for a £5,000 fee in March 1977, before joining Dundee on a free transfer in May 1978. He helped the club to the First Division title in 1978–79 and finished his career with St Johnstone.

Career
Lamb began his career at Preston North End in 1972, who avoided relegation out of the Second Division by a single point in 1972–73 under Alan Ball's stewardship. Bobby Charlton was appointed manager in 1973. The "Lilywhites" failed to avoid the drop in 1973–74 however. They finished ninth in the Third Division in 1974–75, after which Harry Catterick took charge at Deepdale. Unsuccessful promotion campaigns followed in 1975–76 and 1976–77.

He was purchased by Port Vale manager Roy Sproson for a £5,000 fee in March 1977, as a replacement for the recently sold Colin Tartt. He was a regular in the side, featuring in 15 games towards the end of the 1976–77 season. He made 47 appearances in 1977–78, scoring three goals, as the "Valiants" suffered relegation into the Fourth Division under Bobby Smith. Lamb left Vale Park on a free transfer to Dundee in May 1978.

He made 24 appearances, as Tommy Gemmell took the Dens Park club to the Premier Division as champions of the First Division in 1978–79. Lamb then moved on to Alex Stuart's St Johnstone, and played 14 games in 1979–80, before leaving Muirton Park in the summer.

Career statistics
Source:

Honours
Dundee
Scottish Football League First Division: 1978–79

References

1952 births
Living people
Footballers from Falkirk
Scottish footballers
Scotland under-23 international footballers
Association football midfielders
Preston North End F.C. players
Port Vale F.C. players
Dundee F.C. players
St Johnstone F.C. players
English Football League players
Scottish Football League players